Loedelia is a genus of checkered beetles in the family Cleridae. There are at least three described species in Loedelia.

Species
These three species belong to the genus Loedelia:
 Loedelia discoidea (LeConte, 1881)
 Loedelia janthina (LeConte, 1866)
 Loedelia maculicollis (LeConte, 1874)

References

Further reading

 

Cleridae
Articles created by Qbugbot